The men's 5000 metres event at the 2017 European Athletics U23 Championships was held in Bydgoszcz, Poland, at Zdzisław Krzyszkowiak Stadium on 15 July.

Results

References

5000 metres
5000 metres at the European Athletics U23 Championships